Photografting is a technique used in the study of polymers and more in specific polymeric biomaterials. Technically speaking it is the covalent incorporation of functional additives to a polymer matrix or polymer surface using a light-induced mechanism. It is an important technique for the modification of biomaterial surfaces. For example, by graft with polar monomers, the inert polymer surface can become more biocompatible.

References 

Polymer chemistry